Freddie Beauregard (born November 9, 1974), professionally known by his stage name Paradime, is an American rapper and producer from Detroit, Michigan.

He is a Northwood University and Detroit Catholic Central alumni.

Career 
His first appearance was on the Detroit hip-hop scene in 1991 in the form of a solo album, which sold only a few hundred copies. He was discovered by Kid Rock in 1996 and was taken under Rock’s wing, performing with him and writing songs. Dime was signed with Rock's Top Dog record label.

In 1996 he formed his own independent record label, Beats At Will, and released his debut LP Paragraphs in 1999, which was named the best selling Detroit hip-hop album of '99-'00 by Real Detroit Magazine. He followed up in 2001 with his sophomore record, Vices, which is considered by many to be a Detroit hip-hop classic. It earned Paradime numerous awards and nominations at the Detroit Hip-Hop awards. His most critically acclaimed third full-length LP is 11 Steps Down was dropped in 2004.

Awards and nominations
Detroit Music Awards
2000 Outstanding Hip Hop Artist (nominated)
2001 Outstanding Hip Hop Artist (won)
2001 Outstanding Hip-Hop MC (won)
2001 Urban/Funk Songwriter (nominated)
2001 Urban/Funk Vocalist (nominated)
2001 Urban/Funk/Hip Hop Recording (nominated)
2002 Outstanding Hip-Hop MC (won)
2002 Outstanding Hip-Hop Artist/Group (won)
2002 Outstanding Hip-Hop Recording - Vices (won)

Discography

Studio albums
1999: Paragraphs
2001: Vices
2004: 11 Steps Down
2007: Spill At Will

Extended plays
2011: Breaking Beauregard

Mixtapes
2002: Stale Brew Vol 1
2003: Stale Brew Vol 2
2007: Stale Brew Vol 3
2008: Fuck Ya Life (UK release only)
2009: Stale Brew Vol 4

Guest appearances 
 1998: "Strategies And Tactics" by S.U.N. from Shining Underground
 2000: "Heaven" (with Kid Rock) by Uncle Kracker from Double Wide
 2000: "Different Forces" by S.U.N. from School Of Thought
 2000: "Low Down, Grimy" by Shane Capone from Flood These Streetz
 2000: "What I'm All About" by DJ Butter from Kill The DJ
 2001: "Truth" by DJ Butter from Shit Happens
 2003: "Too Far Gone Now" by Hush from Roses & Razorblades 
 2003: "Power Of The Underground" (with Mad Kapp, 5ela, Dogmatic, Strike, Lil Ruck, Dirt Diggla, Proof, Obie Trice, Shim-E-Bango, Undertaka, Wes Chill, King Gordy, Supa Emcee, P. Groove) by SickNotes from The Virus and Sicknote Soldiers
 2006: "Fatstyle" by Fatt Father from Tales of the Childless Father
 2006: "Special" (with Guilty Simpson) by Dabrye from Two/Three
 2008: "Sumthin 4 Da Hataz" (with Fatt Father & Diezel) by Trick-Trick from The Villain
 2008: "Shay Ride" by Fatt Father from Christmas With Fatt Father
 2010: "Chokehold" by The Left from Gas Mask
 2012: "Goose Feathers" (with Aztek The Barfly) by Cancer The Rhino from Grenades, Pistols & Rape Whistles
 2012: "Jive Soul Brother" by Knox Money from Free Nights & Weekends
 2019: "Never" by Apollo Brown from Sincerely, Detroit

References

External links
Paradime's Official website
Paradime on Extreme Kid Rock

Living people
American rappers
People from Livonia, Michigan
21st-century American rappers
1974 births